{{Infobox film
| name = The Cat Who Walked by Herself
| image = 
| caption = A frame story of The Cat Who Walked By Himself
| director = Ideya Garanina
| producer = Ideya Garanina
| writer = Ideya GaraninaMariya Solovyova
| starring = Valentina PonomaryovaElena SanayevaGeorgi BurkovNikolai KarachentsovInna ChurikovaNogon ShumarovAnna KamenkovaNikolai Burlyayev
| music = Sofya Gubaydulina
| cinematography =
| editing = Nadezhda Treshchyova
| distributor =
| released = 
| runtime = 70 minutes
| country = Soviet Union
| language = Russian
| budget =
}}The Cat Who Walked by Herself is a 1988 Soviet animated feature film directed by Ideya Garanina and made at the Soyuzmultfilm studio.  It is based on Rudyard Kipling's short story "The Cat that Walked by Himself". Like the earlier Soviet animated feature Adventures of Mowgli, the film retains the dark, primal tone of Kipling's work. The production includes almost all types of animation technologies.

It is not the only Soviet screen version of this fairy tale: in 1968 the director Aleksandra Snezhko-Blotskaya at the same studio released another animated film, "The Cat Who Walked by Himself", lasting only 20 minutes.

Plot
The film is largely based on Kipling's short story, but expands it with several digressions.

Frame story
A couple - a man and a woman - put their young child in his crib for the night and leave the room. The child starts crying, and the Cat comes into the room to keep him company.  When the child grabs her tail, the Cat angrily reminds him that they agreed "a thousand years ago" that he would not do that.  Upon seeing that the child doesn't remember, the Cat sighs and decides to tell him the story from the beginning. The story starts when the planet was young and life on Earth was emerging with early creatures among erupting volcanoes.

Narrative
The protagonists are the Wild Man and the Woman who is his mate.

Creators

Home video
The film is available on DVD in the collection Золотая коллекция мультфильмов 9 ("Golden Collection of Cartoons 9"), a PAL 2003 Russian release.  It also includes the films Barankin, Be a Man!, Inchgirl, The Pot of Porridge, How the Cat Fought with Mice, and Wings, Legs and Tails (total running time: 142 minutes).

The film has also been released on DVD by the company Krupnyy Plan''.

See also
History of Russian animation
List of animated feature-length films
List of stop-motion films

Notes

External links
The Cat Who Walked by Herself at Animator.ru

Interview with the director 

1988 films
1988 in the Soviet Union
1988 fantasy films
Animated films set in prehistory
Films based on fairy tales
Films based on works by Rudyard Kipling
Soviet animated films
Soyuzmultfilm
1980s stop-motion animated films
1988 animated films
Animated films about cats